Ambalappad is a small village in Kozhikode district, located in Chelannur panchayath.

Location
Ambalappad village connects other parts of India through Koyilandy town.  The nearest airports are at Kannur and Kozhikode.  The nearest railway station is at Koyiandy.  The national highway no.66 passes through Koyilandy and the northern stretch connects to Mangalore, Goa and Mumbai.  The southern stretch connects to Cochin and Trivandrum.  The eastern National Highway No.54 going through Kuttiady connects to Mananthavady, Mysore and Bangalore.

References

Koyilandy area